Georgia Kelly Hall  (born 12 April 1996) is an English professional golfer. She plays on the Ladies European Tour, and the LPGA Tour. In 2018 she won the Women's British Open at Royal Lytham; it was her first victory in a major championship.

Amateur career
Hall began her golfing career at Canford Magna Golf Club. She won two gold medals at the 2013 Australian Youth Olympic Festival. She had a successful amateur career winning the 2013 British Ladies Amateur Golf Championship.

Professional career
Turning professional in July 2014, Hall had an early success, winning the Open Generali de Strasbourg on the LET Access Series. In early 2016, she won the Oates Victorian Open on the ALPG Tour.

In 2017, Hall won the Ladies European Tour Order of Merit after recording seven top 10 finishes during the season, including a tie for third place at the Women's British Open and a tie for tenth place at the Evian Championship.

Hall earned her 2018 LPGA Tour card through qualifying school. In August 2018, she won her first major championship at the 2018 Women's British Open, finishing two strokes ahead of Pornanong Phatlum. She ended the season by winning the Ladies European Tour Order of Merit for the second time, becoming the youngest player to defend the title.

In 2020, while the main tours were suspended due to the COVID-19 pandemic, Hall won two tournaments on the Rose Ladies Series and finished second in the overall standings behind Charley Hull. The LPGA Tour returned at the end of July, and in September she won for the second time on the tour, and the first time in the United States, at the Cambia Portland Classic, where she defeated Ashleigh Buhai in a sudden-death playoff.

Personal life
Hall's father, Wayne, acted as caddie for her during the 2018 Women's British Open. She was born two days before Nick Faldo pulled off one of the greatest sporting comebacks in history to win his third Masters title at Augusta National Golf Club in Augusta, Georgia. Faldo's famous win in Georgia inspired her name.

Hall was appointed Member of the Order of the British Empire (MBE) in the 2019 Birthday Honours for services to golf.

Amateur wins
2012 Girls Amateur Championship
2013 British Ladies Amateur Golf Championship

Professional wins (6)

LPGA Tour wins (2)

LPGA Tour playoff record (1–0)

Ladies European Tour wins (2)

LET Tour playoff record (0–1)

ALPG Tour wins (1)

LET Access Series (1)
2014 Open Generali de Strasbourg

Other wins (2)
2020 Rose Ladies Series – Event 6, Rose Ladies Series – Event 7

Major championships

Wins (1)

Results timeline
Results not in chronological order before 2019.

LA = Low amateur
CUT = missed the half-way cut
NT = no tournament
"T" = tied

Summary

Most consecutive cuts made – 8 (2021 Women's PGA – 2022 British, current)
Longest streak of top-10s – 2 (twice)

World ranking
Position in Women's World Golf Rankings at the end of each calendar year.

Team appearances
Amateur
European Girls' Team Championship (representing the England): 2011, 2012
Junior Vagliano Trophy: (representing Great Britain & Ireland): 2011
Espirito Santo Trophy (representing England): 2012
European Ladies' Team Championship (representing England): 2013
Junior Solheim Cup: (representing Europe): 2013
Vagliano Trophy (representing Great Britain & Ireland): 2013
Curtis Cup (representing Great Britain & Ireland): 2014

Professional
The Queens (representing Europe): 2016
Solheim Cup (representing Europe): 2017, 2019 (winners), 2021 (winners)
European Championships (representing Great Britain): 2018
International Crown (representing England): 2018

Solheim Cup record

References

External links

English female golfers
Ladies European Tour golfers
LPGA Tour golfers
Winners of LPGA major golf championships
Winners of ladies' major amateur golf championships
Solheim Cup competitors for Europe
Members of the Order of the British Empire
Sportspeople from Bournemouth
1996 births
Living people